Bushton may refer to:

Bushton, Illinois, USA
Bushton, Kansas, USA
Bushton, Wiltshire, England